James Blake was the defending champion, but lost in the semifinals to Thomas Johansson.

Ivo Karlović won in the final 6–3, 3–6, 6–1, against Thomas Johansson.

Seeds

Draw

Finals

Top half

Bottom half

External links
 Main draw 
 Qualifying draw 

Singles